Anne-Marie Comparini (born 11 July 1947 in Orange, Vaucluse) is a French politician.  She is a former Member of Parliament and a former President of the Rhône-Alpes Regional Council.

Biography
She studied law at Lyon, graduating in public law, and worked at the Office de Radiodiffusion Télévision Française (former French national broadcaster, equivalent to the BBC) and the Institut national de l'audiovisuel (broadcasting regulator) before becoming parliamentary assistant to Raymond Barre from 1978 to 2001.  She entered the Regional Council of Rhône-Alpes in 1986 and was re-elected in 1992.  Between 1995 and 2001, she was adjutant to Raymond Barre in the Lyon Mayoralty, charged with city policy and universities.

Charles Millon's election to the Presidency of the Regional Council of Rhône-Alpes was invalidated by the State Council in 1999, at which time she was elected to lead the region, largely thanks to the support of the Union for French Democracy who refused to participate in Millon's alliance with the National Front.  She lost to the candidate of the political left, Jean-Jack Queyranne, in the 2004 election.

On 16 June 2002, meanwhile, she was elected a member of parliament to the XIIth Parliament (2002–2007), where she was a member of the Law Commission.  She remained loyal to François Bayrou in the 2007 presidential election, when she was defeated in the first round.  In the same month (June), Patrick Devedjian famously called her a salope ("slut") on-camera on the Lyon metropolitan television channel.

Although a regional councillor promised to head the list of candidates for the Lyon municipality, she nevertheless announced her decision to withdraw from politics in September 2007.  She is to continue as regional councillor until September 2010.

References

This article was translated from :fr:Anne-Marie Comparini in the French Wikipedia on 3 July 2009.

1947 births
Living people
People from Orange, Vaucluse
French people of Italian descent
Union for French Democracy politicians
Democratic Movement (France) politicians
Women members of the National Assembly (France)
Presidents of French regions and overseas collectivities
21st-century French women politicians
20th-century French women politicians
Deputies of the 12th National Assembly of the French Fifth Republic
Politicians from Auvergne-Rhône-Alpes
Chevaliers of the Légion d'honneur